Luis Horna and Sebastián Prieto were the defending champions, but they didn't compete this year.
Martín Alund and Juan-Martín Aranguren defeated Cristóbal Saavedra-Corvalán and Guillermo Rivera-Aránguiz 6–4, 6–4 in the final match.

Seeds

Draw

Draw

References
 Doubles Draw

Lima Challenger - Doubles
2009 Doubles